David Semyonovich Goloschekin (Давид Семёнович Голощёкин; born 1944, in Moscow) is a Russian jazz musician. A multi-instrumentalist, performing on the violin (mainly), saxophone, vibraphone, piano, bass, drums and flugelhorn.

Awards
2015 Order of Friendship, Russia.
1999 People's Artist of Russia
 Polish honorary badge "For Merits before Polish Culture" (odznaka honorowa «Zasłużony dla Kultury Polskiej»)

References 

1944 births
Living people
Soviet jazz musicians
Russian jazz musicians
Russian violinists
Male violinists
Musicians from Moscow
People's Artists of Russia
Honored Artists of the RSFSR
21st-century violinists
21st-century Russian male musicians
Male jazz musicians